Rune Sola (born 1985) is a Norwegian motorcycle speedway rider who rode in 2004 Speedway Grand Prix of Norway.

Speedway Grand Prix results

Career details

World Championships 

 Individual World Championship (Speedway Grand Prix)
 2004 - 40th place (2 points in one event)
 Team U-19 World Championship
 2005 - 3rd place in Qualifying Round 2

European Championships 

 Individual European Championship
 2007 - 15th place in Semi-Final B

See also 
 Norway national speedway team
 List of Speedway Grand Prix riders

References 

1985 births
Living people
Norwegian speedway riders